Øye is a village in Vang Municipality in Innlandet county, Norway. The European route E16 highway runs through the village, heading west through the Filefjell mountains on the way to the west coast of Norway. The historic Øye Stave Church and the newer Øye Church are both located in the village.

References

Vang, Innlandet
Villages in Innlandet